Phil Joslin may refer to:

 Phil Joslin (footballer) (1916–1980), English footballer
 Phil Joslin (referee) (born 1959), English football referee